Agni in Samskrita means "fire", and according to Ayurveda, Agni happens to be the entity that is responsible for all digestive and metabolic processes in the human beings.

Classification of Agni based on its location 
Depending upon the stage of metabolism where a specific Agni is functionally active, Agni has been classified into three sub-classes: 'Jaṭharāgni', 'Bhūtāgni' and 'Dhātvagni'.

Jaṭharāgni 
While Jaṭharāgni acts on the food in the digestive tract and converts it into absorbable form, the Bhūtāgni acts after the digested material has been absorbed.

Bhūtāgni 
Bhūtāgni is of 5 types. Each of these 5 acts on the 5 primordial constituents of the absorbed food: Earth, Water, Fire, Air, and Space. These 5 Bhutagnis transform the substrates into such form that can be assimilated at tissue level.

Dhātvagni 
The third class of Agni, the Dhātvagni, acts at the level of tissue metabolism and is helpful in the tissue nourishment tissue metabolism. This is of 7 types based on the kind of tissue that it helps nourishing.

Classification of Agni based on its strength 
Further, Ayurveda recognizes four functional states of Agni: Samāgni(regular), Vişamāgni (irregular), Tīkşņāgni(intense), and Mandāgni(weak). 
.

Samāgni  
Samāgni ensures complete digestion of the food ingested at the proper time without any irregularity. Its activity is neither too intense nor too weak. It is just appropriate and therefore, is ideal too. This results when all Doshas, Vata-Pitta-Kapha are in a state of equilibrium.

Vişamāgni 
Vişamāgni represents an unpredictable state of Agni, which is due to the dominance of Vayu. It sometimes quickly digests the food and at other times it does so very slowly, representing unpredictability.

Tīkşņāgni 
Tīkşņāgni results because of the dominance of Pitta which is intense, and hence, it easily digests even a very heavy meal, in a very short span of time.

Mandāgni 
Mandāgni is opposite to the Tīkşņāgni: it is subdued in its activity. This Agni is unable to digest and metabolize even a small quantity of food. This state of Agni is a result of the dominance of Kapha.

 Sushruta Samhita
 Traditional medicine

References

Ayurveda
Hindu philosophical concepts